Micah Obonyo Dulo Obiero (born 22 February 2001) is an English professional footballer who plays as a striker for National League club Wealdstone.

Early life
Obiero was born in Redbridge, London. Obiero is the son of the Kenyan former footballer Henry Obiero. His brother, Zech, is also a professional footballer.

Career
Obiero began his career in the Leyton Orient academy, before having a spell at the XYZ Academy in Hackney, London. He arrived on trial at Huddersfield Town during the 2016–17 season, before signing a professional contract with the club in April 2018. He signed a new contract with the club in January 2020, taking him through to June 2022.

Obiero made his senior debut for Huddersfield on 22 July 2020, the last day of the 2019–20 season, coming on at half-time in a 4–1 Championship defeat to Millwall.

On 16 October 2020, he joined League Two side Carlisle United on loan until January 2021. He made four league appearances for the club and scored his first professional goal against Aston Villa under-23s in the EFL Trophy, before returning to Huddersfield as planned in January 2021.

On 29 March 2021, Obiero joined National League side FC Halifax Town on loan for the remainder of the 2020-21 season.

On 17 July 2022, Obiero joined National League North club Boston United.

On 8 October 2022, Obiero signed for National League club Wealdstone. He made his debut on the same day, appearing as a substitute in a 2-1 defeat to Boreham Wood. Obiero's first goal for the club came on 26 October, a consolation in a 6-1 defeat to Notts County.

References

2001 births
Living people
People from the London Borough of Redbridge
English footballers
English people of Kenyan descent
Association football midfielders
Huddersfield Town A.F.C. players
Carlisle United F.C. players
FC Halifax Town players
Boston United F.C. players
English Football League players
National League (English football) players